The 1974 Eisenhower Trophy took place 30 October to 2 November at the Casa de Campo in La Romana, Dominican Republic. It was the ninth World Amateur Team Championship for the Eisenhower Trophy. The tournament was a 72-hole stroke play team event with 35 four-man teams. The best three scores for each round counted towards the team total.

The United States won the Eisenhower Trophy for the fourth successive time, finishing 10 strokes ahead of the silver medalists, Japan. Brazil took the bronze medal while South Africa finished fourth. Jaime Gonzalez from Brazil and American Jerry Pate had the lowest individual scores, six-over-par 294.

The event was originally planned to be played in Malaysia but was moved because of the inability of all member countries to compete there as the Malaysian government's policy prohibited entry into Malaysia of representatives of South Africa.

Teams
35 teams contested the event. Each team except one had four players. The team representing El Salvador had only three players.

Scores

Source:

Individual leaders
There was no official recognition for the lowest individual scores.

Source:

References

External links
Record Book on International Golf Federation website 

Eisenhower Trophy
Golf tournaments in the Dominican Republic
Eisenhower Trophy
Eisenhower Trophy
Eisenhower Trophy
Eisenhower Trophy